Lukas Ried (born 10 October 1995) is an Austrian football player.

Career

SV Lafnitz
Ried left SV Lafnitz at the end of 2018.

Honours

Club

SV Lafnitz
Austrian Regionalliga Central (1) 2017-18

References

External links

1995 births
Living people
Austrian footballers
Association football midfielders
TSV Hartberg players
SV Lafnitz players
Austrian Football Bundesliga players
2. Liga (Austria) players
Austrian Regionalliga players